Frank Shields (born 29 March 1947) is an Australian director of film and TV.

He broke into the film industry in the 1970s by making a film about Breaker Morant which he shot partly in Africa.

Select Credits
The Breaker (1974) (documentary about Breaker Morant)
Hostage (1983)
The Surfer (1986)
Fatal Sky (1990)
 Hurrah (1998)
The Finder (2001)

References

External links

Australian film directors
Living people
1947 births